Intermediate trophoblast is a distinct subtype of trophoblastic tissue that arises from the cytotrophoblast.

It is sub-categorized by location:
Villous intermediate trophoblast: 
at anchoring villi of trophoblastic column
Implantation site intermediate trophoblast: 
at implantation site (or basal plate), differentiated from villous intermediate trophoblast
Chorionic-type intermediate trophoblast
at chorionic laeve of fetal membrane, differentiated from villous intermediate trophoblast

Function
The function of the implantation site intermediate trophoblast is to anchor the placenta to the maternal tissue.

Histomorphology
 Villous intermediate trophoblast
 polyhedral and uniform nuclei
 prominent cell border; abundant eosinophilic to clear cytoplasm
 cohesive growth
 Implantation site intermediate trophoblast
 pleomorphic irregular nuclei, large and hyperchromatic, may multinucleation
 abundant eosinophilic to amphophilic cytoplasm
 infiltrative growth (splitting muscle, replacing vascular wall ...etc)
 Chorionic-type intermediate trophoblast
 round to polyhedral nuclei, may multinucleation
 abundant eosinophilic to clear cytoplasm
 cohesive growth

Pathology
Intermediate trophoblasts are thought to be the cell of origin for:
Exaggerated placental site (EPS): implantation site IT
Placental site nodule (PSN): chorionic-type IT
Placental site trophoblastic tumour (PSTT): implantation site IT
Epithelioid trophoblastic tumour (ETT): chorionic-type IT

References

Embryology